She's Living for This is an American television comedy and variety series created by Keith Levy and Josh Rosenzweig. The show currently airs on LGBT cable network here!. The series stars drag performer Sherry Vine. The series premiered on February 24, 2012.

here! produced six episodes for season one. The network announced a second season of the show to begin production in the summer 2012 for a fall 2012 premiere.

In 2012, it was announced that episodes of She's Living for This would be made available on online video service Hulu.

Premise
She's Living for This provides a modern update on the classic TV variety show standard set by the likes of Sonny & Cher, Carol Burnett, and Benny Hill. Each half-hour episode features LGBT comics and entertainers. The show consists of comedy sketches, special guests, musical numbers, and short films.

Cast

Main cast
 Sherry Vine serves as the show's host and takes on various roles during the various skits and performances.

Guest stars
 Candis Cayne
 Justin Vivian Bond
 Joey Arias
 Cazwell
 Peppermint
 Bianca Del Rio
 Sharon Needles

Recurring cast 
 Sam Pancake
 David Ilku
 Busted

Episodes
 “The Justin Vivan Bond Episode”
 “The Peppermint Episode”
 “The Joey Arias Episode”
 “The Cazwell Episode”
 “The Bianca Del Rio Episode”
 “The Candis Cayne Episode”
 "The Pandora Boxx Episode"

Production

The concept for She's Living for This began 20 years ago in Los Angeles. Keith Levy asked director Josh Rosenzweig to collaborate on a project. Keith was just developing Sherry Vine and he wanted to do a play- a theatrical piece as Sherry. So, he chose a one-woman show call ‘’Sorry Wrong Number’’ and when they finished, Josh said to him that he was a modern-day drag version of Carol Burnett and that he should have my own variety show.

Over the course of the next two decades, Josh and Keith worked together on plays, musicals, music videos, television shows and films. Two of the "featurettes" they did together Scream Teen Scream and Charlie! played in film festivals.

All along the way, the idea of the variety show was kept alive. And then last year, Josh said he thought he could get it produced at here! with the help of general manager Eric Feldman. They finally started shooting in the fall of 2011.

References

External links

2010s American variety television series
2012 American television series debuts
2010s American sketch comedy television series
Here TV original programming
2010s American LGBT-related comedy television series